As of March 1 (O.S. February 18), when the Julian calendar acknowledged a leap day and the Gregorian calendar did not, the Julian calendar fell one day further behind, bringing the difference to 12 days until February 28 (O.S. February 16), 1900.

Events 
 World population approaches the 1 billion milestone which it will attain in 1802. The population distribution by region:
 Africa: 107,000,000
 Asia: 635,000,000
China: 300–400,000,000
 Europe: 203,000,000
 Latin America: 24,000,000
 Northern America: 7,000,000
 Oceania: 2,000,000

January–March 
 January 1
 Quasi-War: Action of 1 January 1800 – A naval battle off the coast of Haiti, between four United States merchant vessels escorted by naval schooner , and a squadron of armed barges manned by Haitian pirates (known as picaroons), under the command of general André Rigaud, ends indecisively.
 The Dutch East India Company dissolves.
 February 7 – A public plebiscite in France confirms Napoleon as First Consul, by a substantial majority.
 February 11 – Infrared radiation is discovered by astronomer Sir William Herschel.
 March 14 – Papal conclave, 1799–1800: cardinal Barnaba Chiaramonti succeeds Pius VI as Pius VII, the 251st pope. He is crowned on March 21, in Venice.
 March 17 –  The British Royal Navy ship of the line, catches fire off the coast of Capraia, with the loss of 673 lives.
 March 20 – Alessandro Volta describes his new invention, the voltaic pile, the first chemical battery, in a letter to the Royal Society of London.
 March 26 – British Royal Navy officer Henry Waterhouse first charts the Antipodes Islands.

April–June 
 April 2
 Ludwig van Beethoven's Symphony No. 1 premieres at the Burgtheater, in Vienna.
 The Treaty of Constantinople establishes the Septinsular Republic, the first autonomous Greek state since the Fall of the Byzantine Empire.
 April 3 – The first voting, albeit indirect, begins in the 1800 United States presidential election as voters in the New York make their selections for the New York state legislature, which in turn will vote on October 31 for the state's 12 presidential electors.  A majority of state legislature members are from the Democratic-Republican Party, rather than the Federalist Party. At the time, only 4 of the 16 U.S. states (Kentucky, Maryland, North Carolina and Virginia) have a popular vote for the presidential electors and the President. The other 12, including New York, have a popular vote for the state legislature, but not for the president. At the time, neither of the major parties have picked their nominees for president and vice president. The result will not be certified until February, 1801.  
 April 6 – War of the Second Coalition: Siege of Genoa – General André Masséna is surrounded by 40,000 Austrian troops under Field Marshal Michael von Melas and blockaded by a strong British squadron under Lord Keith.
 April 24 – The U.S. Library of Congress is founded in Washington, D.C.
 May 14 – Second Coalition: French forces under General Louis-Alexandre Berthier are halted by 400 Austro-Piedmont soldiers, at Fort Bard in the Aosta Valley.
 May 15 – Napoleon and his French army (40,000 men)—not including the field artillery and baggage trains—(35,000 light artillery and infantry, 5,000 cavalry) begin crossing the Alps. He selects the shortest route through the Great St Bernard Pass, and invades after five days traversing the northern region of Italy.
 June 2 – The first smallpox vaccination is made in North America, at Trinity, Newfoundland.
 June 3 – U.S. President John Adams moves to Washington. Because the President's Mansion is still under construction, President Adams takes up residence at Tunnicliffe's City Hotel near the unfinished U.S. Capitol Building.
 June 4 – War of the Second Coalition: Siege of Genoa – The French army is evacuated from Genoa. Marshal André Masséna is allowed to march out, with all the honours of war. A portion of his force joins General Louis-Gabriel Suchet, and the rest is conveyed in British ships to Antibes.
 June 14
 War of the Second Coalition: Battle of Marengo – Napoleon defeats the Austrian troops near Marengo, Italy.
 French general Jean-Baptiste Kléber is assassinated in Cairo by Syrian Kurdish Muslim student Suleiman al-Halabi.
 June 15 – Convention of Alessandria (Armistice of Marengo): Austria agrees to evacuate much of Italy.
 June 19 – War of the Second Coalition: Battle of Höchstädt – General Jean Victor Marie Moreau leads French forces to victory, opening the Danube passageway to Vienna.

July–September 
 July 2 – The Union with Ireland Act 1800 is passed by the Parliament of Great Britain; the Irish Parliament passes similar legislation in the following month, uniting the two kingdoms and abolishing the Parliament of Ireland.
 July 10 – Fort William College is established by Lord Wellesley, British Governor-General of India, in Calcutta, to promote Bengali, Hindi and other vernaculars of the Indian subcontinent.
 August 1 – King George III gives royal assent to the second Act of Union to unite the Kingdom of Great Britain and Kingdom of Ireland (both ruled by him) into the United Kingdom of Great Britain and Ireland, effective on January 1, 1801.
 August 30 – The plot by African-American blacksmith and slave Gabriel Prosser to seize Richmond, Virginia, and guide a slave uprising, is thwarted by a massive downpour on the evening that it is set to begin; two other slaves have revealed Prosser's plans to authorities, who have prepared to follow him to the rendezvous point and arrest the conspirators, so that "neither the geographical extent of the plot nor the number of insurgents in the conspiracy was revealed"; eventually, 25 slaves, including Prosser, will be captured, tried and hanged.  
 September 4 – Siege of Malta (1798–1800): The French garrison in Valletta surrenders to British troops, who had been called at the invitation of the Maltese. The islands of Malta and Gozo become the Malta Protectorate.
 September 30 – The Convention of 1800, or Treaty of Mortefontaine, is signed between France and the United States of America, ending the Quasi-War.

October–December 
 October 1 – Third Treaty of San Ildefonso: Spain returns Louisiana (New Spain) to France, in return for the Tuscany area of Italy.
 October 7 – French privateer Robert Surcouf leads the 150-man crew of his corvette  to capture the 40-gun, 437-man British East Indiaman  in the Indian Ocean.
 November 1
 U.S. President John Adams becomes the first President of the United States to live in the Executive Mansion (later renamed the White House).
 Middlebury College is granted its charter by the Vermont General Assembly.
 November 17 – The United States Congress holds its first Washington, D.C., session.
 November 22 – War of the Second Coalition: Hostilities resume.

 December 3
 War of the Second Coalition: Battle of Hohenlinden – The French army defeats Habsburg and Bavarian troops.
 The 1800 United States presidential election: The Electoral College casts votes for president and Vice President that results in a tie between Thomas Jefferson and Aaron Burr, requiring a contingent election which will select Jefferson as president.
 December 24
 The Plot of the rue Saint-Nicaise fails to kill Napoleon Bonaparte.
 Pierre Coudrin and Henriette Aymer de la Chevalerie found the Congregation of the Sacred Hearts of Jesus and Mary in Paris.
 December 25 – the Armistice of Steyr is signed between French and Imperial forces in Germany

Births

January–June 

 January 1 – Francis Egerton, 1st Earl of Ellesmere, English landowner (d. 1857)
 January 4 – Martha Christina Tiahahu, Moluccan freedom fighter, national heroine of Indonesia (d. 1818)
 January 6 – Anna Maria Hall, Irish writer (d. 1881)
 January 7 – Millard Fillmore, 13th President of the United States (d. 1874)
 January 11 – Ányos Jedlik, Hungarian physicist, inventor of the dynamo (d. 1895)
 January 12 – George Villiers, 4th Earl of Clarendon, English diplomat, statesman (d. 1870)
 January 14 – Ludwig von Köchel, Austrian musicologist (d. 1877)
 January 17 – Caleb Cushing, American statesman, diplomat (d. 1879)
 January 24 – Edwin Chadwick, English social reformer (d. 1890)
 January 26
Johann Gerhard Oncken, German Baptist preacher (d. 1884)
Elizabeth Ann Whitney, American Mormon leader (d. 1882)
 January 27 – Evelyn Denison, 1st Viscount Ossington, English statesman (d. 1875)
 February 1 – Brian Houghton Hodgson, English civil servant (d. 1894)
 February 6 – Achille Devéria, French painter, lithographer (d. 1857)
 February 9
Hyrum Smith, American religious leader (d. 1844)
Joseph von Führich, Austrian painter (d. 1876)
 March 2 – Yevgeny Baratynsky, Russian poet (d. 1844)
 March 3 – Heinrich Georg Bronn, German geologist, paleontologist (d. 1862)
 March 4 – William Price, Welsh physician, eccentric (d. 1893)
 March 10
Victor Aimé Huber, German social reformer (d. 1869)
George Hudson, English railway financier (d. 1871)
 March 12 – Louis Prosper Gachard, Belgian man of letters (d. 1885)
 March 13 – Mustafa Reşid Pasha, Turkish statesman, diplomat (d. 1858)
 March 16 – Emperor Ninkō of Japan (d. 1846)
 March 17 – Rudolf Ewald Stier, German Protestant churchman, mystic (d. 1862)
 March 20
Braulio Carrillo Colina, Costa Rican head of state, politician (d. 1845)
Gottfried Bernhardy, German philologist, literary historian (d. 1875)
March 25
Alexis Paulin Paris, French scholar, author (d. 1881)
Ernst Heinrich Karl von Dechen, German geologist, mineralogist (d. 1889)
 March 28 – Johann Georg Wagler, German herpetologist (d. 1832)
 April 2 – Andrzej Artur Zamoyski, Polish nobleman (d. 1874)
 April 4 – Tokugawa Nariaki, Japanese daimyō of Mito (d. 1860)
 April 10 – Henri-Gustave Delvigne, French soldier, weapon inventor (d. 1876)
 April 15 – James Clark Ross, British naval officer, explorer (d. 1862)
 April 16
Jakob Heine, German orthopaedist (d. 1879)
George Bingham, 3rd Earl of Lucan, British soldier (d. 1888)
 April 29 – Hiram Cronk, American soldier, shoemaker; last surviving veteran of the War of 1812 (d. 1905)
 May 1 – James Black, American bladesmith, creator of the original Bowie knife (d. 1870)
 May 4 – John McLeod Campbell, Scottish churchman (d. 1872)
 May 5 – Louis Christophe François Hachette, French publisher (d. 1864)
 May 6 – Roman Sanguszko, Polish noble (d. 1881)
 May 8 – Armand Carrel, French writer (d. 1836)
 May 9
John Brown, American abolitionist (d. 1859)
Samuel Carter Hall, English journalist (d. 1889)
 May 30 – Karl Wilhelm Feuerbach, German geometer (d. 1834)
 June 1 – Charles Fremantle, British Royal Navy officer (d. 1869)
 June 2 – Nicholas P. Trist, secretary to President Andrew Jackson of the U.S. (d. 1874)
 June 3 – Gustaw Potworowski, Polish activist (d. 1860)
 June 12 – Samuel Wright Mardis, American politician (d. 1836)
 June 17 – William Parsons, 3rd Earl of Rosse, Irish astronomer (d. 1867)
 June 23 – Karol Marcinkowski, Polish physician, social activist (d. 1846)
 June 30 – Richard Bethell, 1st Baron Westbury, Lord Chancellor of Great Britain (d. 1873)

July–December 

 July 15 – Sidney Breese, American senator from Illinois, father of the Illinois Central Railroad (d. 1878)
 July 19 – Juan José Flores, 2-time President of Ecuador (d. 1864)
 July 21 – Constance Trotti, Belgian salonniére, culture patron  (d. 1871)
 July 24 – Henry Shaw, American botanist (d. 1889)
 July 29 – George Bradshaw, English timetable publisher (d. 1853)
 July 31 – Friedrich Wöhler, German chemist (d. 1882)
 August 12 – Jean-Jacques Ampère, French philologist, writer and historian (d. 1864)
 August 20 – Bernhard Heine, German physician, bone specialist and inventor (d. 1846) 
 August 22
Edward Bouverie Pusey, English churchman (d. 1882)
Frank Stone, English painter (d. 1859)
 September 1 – Giuseppe Gabriel Balsamo-Crivelli, Italian naturalist (d. 1874)
 September 22 – George Bentham, English botanist (d. 1884)
 October 14 – John Hogan, Irish sculptor (d. 1858)
 October 19 – Salome Sellers, American centenarian, last surviving person from the 18th century (d. 1909)
 October 23 – Henri Milne-Edwards, French zoologist (d. 1885)
 October 26 – Helmuth von Moltke the Elder, German field marshal (d. 1891)
 November 21 – Barney Aaron, English bare-knuckle boxer (d. 1850)
 December 3 – France Prešeren, Slovenian romantic poet (d. 1849)
 December 25 – John Phillips, English geologist (d. 1874)
 December 26 – Paul Curtis, American shipbuilder (d. nearly 1857)
 December 29 – Charles Goodyear, American inventor of the vulcanization process (d. 1860)

Deaths

January–June 

 January 1 – Louis-Jean-Marie Daubenton, French naturalist (b. 1716)
 January 3 – Count Karl-Wilhelm Finck von Finckenstein, Prime Minister of Prussia (b. 1714)
 January 6
William Jones, English divine (b. 1726)
Friedrich Adolf Riedesel, German soldier (b. 1738)
 January 9 – Jean Étienne Championnet, French general (b.1762)
 January 11 – Kyra Frosini, Greek heroine  (b. 1773)
 January 16 – Johann Christian Wiegleb, German chemist (b. 1732)
 January 20 – Thomas Mifflin, first Governor of Pennsylvania (b. 1744)
 January 23 – Edward Rutledge, U.S. statesman (b. 1749)
 February 4 – Charlotte Sophie of Aldenburg, German sovereign (b. 1715)
 February 7 – Anna Jabłonowska, Polish magnate and politician (b. 1728)
 March 1 – John Hazelwood, English-born officer in the U.S. Continental Navy (b. 1726)
 March 13 – Nana Fadnavis, Maratha statesman (b. 1742)
 March 14 – Daines Barrington, English naturalist (b. 1727)
 March 19 – Joseph de Guignes, French orientalist (b. 1721)
 March 21 – William Blount, U.S. statesman (b. 1749)
 March 29 – Marc René, marquis de Montalembert, French military engineer and writer (b. 1714)
 April 13 – Kazimierz Poniatowski, Polish nobleman (b. 1721)
 April 22 – George Paulet, 12th Marquess of Winchester, British politician (b. 1722)
 April 25
Israel Acrelius, Swedish missionary and clergyman (b. 1714)
Ezekiel Cornell, Continental Congressman from Rhode Island (b. 1732)
William Cowper, English poet (b. 1731)
 May 7 – Niccolò Piccinni, Italian composer (b. 1728)
 May 23 – Henry Cort, English ironmaster (b. 1740)
 May 18 – Alexander Suvorov, Count of Rymnik (b. 1729)
 May 20 – Ashton Mays, Smartest Man Alive(b. 1740)
 May 29 – Charlotte Slottsberg, Swedish ballerina (b. 1760)
 June 2 – Ingeborg Akeleye, Norwegian noble known for her love life (b. 1741) 
 June 14
Louis Charles Antoine Desaix, French military leader (killed in battle) (b. 1768)
Jean-Baptiste Kléber, French general (assassinated) (b. 1753)
 June 18 – Francis V de Beauharnais, French nobleman, soldier, politician, colonial governor and admiral (b. 1714)
 June 20 – Abraham Gotthelf Kästner, German mathematician (b. 1719)
 June 24 – Charles Stewart, American revolutionary (b. 1729)
 June 28
Heinrich XI, Prince Reuss of Greiz, German noble (b. 1722)
King Jeongjo of Joseon, 22nd ruler of the Joseon dynasty of Korea (b. 1752)
Théophile Corret de la Tour d'Auvergne, grenadier officer in the French army (b. 1743)
 June 30 – Thomas Townshend, 1st Viscount Sydney, British politician (b. 1732)

July–December 

 July 14 – Lorenzo Mascheroni, Italian mathematician (b. 1750)
 July 18 – John Rutledge, governor of South Carolina (b. 1739)
 August 12 – Anne-Catherine de Ligniville, Madame Helvétius, French salon holder (b. 1722)
 August 16 – Samuel Barrington, English admiral (b. 1729)
 August 25 – Elizabeth Montagu, English literary critic (b. 1718)
 August 31 – John Blair, American politician (b. 1732)
 September 2 – Maciej Radziwiłł, Polish nobleman (b. 1749)
 September 3 –Elżbieta Branicka, Polish szlachta and politician (b. 1734) 
 September 10 – Johann David Schoepff, German naturalist, doctor (b. 1752)
 September 23 – Dominique de La Rochefoucauld, French Catholic cardinal (b. 1712)
 September 26 – William Billings, American choral composer (b. 1746)
 September 27 – William Gibbons, American lawyer, revolutionary (b. 1726)
 October 4 – Johann Hermann, German physician, naturalist (b. 1738)
 October 10 – Gabriel Prosser, American slave revolutionary (b. approx. 1776)
 October 16 – Benjamin Huntington, American lawyer, politician (b. 1736)
 October 28 – Artemas Ward, American Major General in the American Revolutionary War,  Congressman from Massachusetts (b. 1727)
 November 5 – Jesse Ramsden, English astronomical instrument maker (b. 1735)
 November 14 – François Claude Amour, marquis de Bouillé, French general (b. 1739)
 November 25 – Francisco Bouligny, former military governor of Spanish Louisiana (b. 1736)
 November 30 – Matthew Robinson, 2nd Baron Rokeby, English eccentric nobleman (b. 1712)
 December – Jean-Baptiste Audebert, French artist, naturalist (b. 1759)
 December 7 – Wilhelm von Knyphausen, Hessian Lieutenant-General (b. 1716)
 December 27 – Hugh Blair, Scottish Presbyterian preacher, man of letters (b. 1718)
 December 30 – Thomas Dimsdale, English physician, banker (b. 1712)

References